Joseph Edward Nicholls was an English footballer who played in the Football League for Clapton Orient.

References

English footballers
Association football defenders
English Football League players
Wolverhampton Wanderers F.C. players
Leyton Orient F.C. players